Arrivederci, mostro! is the tenth studio album by Italian rock singer-songwriter Luciano Ligabue. Produced by Corrado Rustici, the album was released on 11 May 2010, exactly 20 years after the release of Ligabue's self-titled debut album. After spending its first four weeks at number one on the Italian Albums Chart, Arrivederci, mostro! returned to the top spot three additional times, completing a chart run of nine non-consecutive weeks atop the chart. The album was also certified diamond by the Federation of the Italian Music Industry, and it became the best-selling album of 2010 in Italy.

The song "Quando mi vieni a prendere? (Dendermonde 23/01/09)" was written in dedication to the victims of the 2009 Dendermonde nursery attack.

Track listing

Charts

See also
 List of best-selling albums by year (Italy)

References

Italian-language albums
2010 albums